Route 42 may refer to:

Route 42 (WMATA), a bus route in Washington, D.C.
London Buses route 42

See also
List of highways numbered 42

42